Guy le Mouroux (9 January 1918 – 11 August 1990) was a French sailor. He competed in the Dragon event at the 1952 Summer Olympics.

References

External links
 

1918 births
1990 deaths
French male sailors (sport)
Olympic sailors of France
Sailors at the 1952 Summer Olympics – Dragon
Sportspeople from Morbihan